The 2018–19 San Jose Sharks season was the 28th season for the National Hockey League franchise that was established on May 9, 1990. The Sharks clinched a playoff spot on March 19, 2019, when the Minnesota Wild lost to the Colorado Avalanche.

The Sharks advanced all the way to the Western Conference Finals, where they were defeated by the eventual Stanley Cup Champion St. Louis Blues in six games.

As of 2023, this represents the most recent season making the playoffs for the Sharks.

Standings

Schedule and results

Preseason
The preseason schedule was published on June 18, 2018.

Regular season
The regular season schedule was released in June 2018.

Playoffs

The Sharks entered the playoffs as the Pacific Division's second seed and faced the third seed of the same division, the Vegas Golden Knights, defeating them in seven games.

In the Second Round, the Sharks faced the Colorado Avalanche, defeating them in seven games.

In the Conference Finals, the Sharks faced the St. Louis Blues, and lost in six games.

Player statistics

Skaters

Goaltenders

 

†Denotes player spent time with another team before joining the Sharks. Stats reflect time with the Sharks only.
‡Denotes player was traded mid-season. Stats reflect time with the Sharks only.
Bold/italics denotes franchise record.

Transactions
The Sharks have been involved in the following transactions during the 2018–19 season.

Trades

Free agents

Contract terminations

Waivers

Signings

Draft picks

Below are the San Jose Sharks' selections at the 2018 NHL Entry Draft, which was held on June 22 and 23, 2018, at the American Airlines Center in Dallas, Texas.

Notes:
 The Toronto Maple Leafs' third-round pick went to the San Jose Sharks as the result of a trade on June 23, 2018, that sent a fourth and fifth-round pick both in 2018 (114th and 145th overall) to Arizona in exchange for this pick.
 The Edmonton Oilers' fourth-round pick went to the San Jose Sharks as the result of a trade on June 23, 2018, that sent Vegas' fourth-round pick and Florida's fifth-round pick both in 2018 (123rd and 139th overall) to Montreal in exchange for this pick.
 The Nashville Predators' sixth-round pick went to the San Jose Sharks as the result of a trade on February 25, 2018, that sent Brandon Bollig and Troy Grosenick to Nashville in exchange for this pick.

Awards

References

San Jose Sharks seasons
San Jose Sharks
Sharks
Sharks
National Hockey League All-Star Game hosts